The Moonee Valley Fillies Classic is a registered Moonee Valley Racing Club Group 2 Thoroughbred horse race for fillies aged three years old, at set weight conditions, over a distance of 1600 metres. It is held at Moonee Valley Racecourse in Melbourne, Australia on W. S. Cox Plate Day.

History
In 2012 the race was moved from March to October, hence the event was run twice in 2012. In 2013 the race was run on Friday night and back to Saturday for 2015.

Name
 1998–2004 - Moonee Valley Oaks
 2005 - Woodstock Mile
 2006 - Woodstock Classic
 2007 - Hollylodge Classic
 2008 - Thoroughbred Classic
 2009, 2011–2012 - Sportingbet Fillies Classic
 2010 - Mooney Valley Fillies Classic
 2013 - Jeep Fillies Classic  
 2014 - Drummond Golf Fillies Classic
 2015 - Alliance Broking Services Fillies Classic
 2016 - P.W. Glass Fillies Classic
 2017 - italktravel Fillies Classic
 2018 - Aquis Farm Fillies Classic
 2019 - Antler Luggage Fillies Classic

Distance
 1998–2004 - 2040 metres
 2005 - 1600 metres
 2006–2009 - 1500 metres
 2010 onwards  - 1600 metres

Grade
 1998 - Listed Race
 1999–2000 - Group 3
 2001 onwards - Group 2

Winners

 2022 - Zoe's Promise
 2021 - Mokulua
 2020 - Yes Baby Yes
 2019 - La Falaise
 2018 - Mystic Journey
 2017 - Banish
 2016 - Nurse Kitchen
 2015 - My Poppette
 2014 - Lumosty
 2013 - Gypsy Diamond
 2012 (Oct.) - Kazanluk
 2012 (Mar.) - Empress Rock
 2011 - Lights Of Heaven
 2010 - My Emotion
 2009 - Romneya
 2008 - Absolut Glam
 2007 - Anamato
 2006 - Pure Harmony
 2005 - Dizelle
 2004 - Special Harmony
 2003 - Ribe
 2002 - Elegant Fashion
 2001 - Dandify 
 2000 - Hill of Grace  
 1999 - Sunline  
 1998 - † Kensington Palace / Champagne
 1997 - Star Cossack
 1996 - Just A Runner

† Dead heat

See also
 List of Australian Group races
 Group races

References

Horse races in Australia